King of Kings is the sixth studio album by the German symphonic metal band Leaves' Eyes. It contains guest appearances of (among others) Simone Simons from the Dutch symphonic metal band Epica and Lindy-Fay Hella from the Norwegian dark folk act Wardruna. It is their last album with Liv Kristine on vocals.

Track listing

Editions
The exclusive gold edition (released throughout Nuclear Blast) is limited to 300 box sets with golden swords, limited double CD in Media Book, golden swords sculpture in the style of the album story and a handwritten letter from singer Liv Kristine.
The US Edition, released in 2016, features unique cover art and a re-recording of "Edge of Steel" with Leaves' Eyes's new vocalist Elina Siirala, following Liv Kristine's departure. This version of the song also appears on the band's 2016 EP Fires in the North and has its own music video.

Personnel
Leaves' Eyes
Thorsten Bauer - bass, guitars
Liv Kristine - female vocals
Alexander Krull - vocals, keyboards, samples, producer
Joris Nijenhuis - drums
Pete Streit - guitars

Guest musicians
White Russian Symphony Orchestra - orchestra (directed by Victor Smolski)
Simone Simons (Epica) - vocals on Edges of Steel
Lindy-Fay Hella (Wardruna) - vocals on Blazing Waters
London Voices (The Lord of the Rings, Star Wars, The Hobbit, Harry Potter and Interstellar) - choir ensemble
Oliver Palotai (Kamelot) - piano on The Waking Eye
Leon Krull - spoken words on Sweven
Christian Roch (E-Lane, Remember Twilight) - uilleann pipes, flute, whistle
Christoph Kutzer - cello
Janna Kirchhof - nyckelharpa
Kathrin Schlumpf - harp
Elvya Dulcimer - hammered dulcimer
Fieke van den Hurk - hurdy gurdy
Sophie Zaaijer - solo violin
Knuth Jerxsen - percussions

Design
Stefan Heilemann - artwork

Charts

References

External links
 Official website

2015 albums
Leaves' Eyes albums
AFM Records albums
Nuclear Blast albums
Albums produced by Alexander Krull
Cultural depictions of Harald Fairhair